Golden Bisquits is the sixth album (fifth studio album) by American rock band Three Dog Night, released in 1971.

The album is a compilation of hits from Three Dog Night's first four studio albums, including all nine single A-sides issued by the band to date.  The album was released concurrently with the band's tenth single (not included on Golden Bisquits),  "Joy to the World", from their previous album Naturally (1970).  "Joy to the World" reached #1 in early 1971, becoming one of Three Dog Night's most enduring songs.  The three songs included in Golden Bisquits that were not issued as single A-sides are "Don't Make Promises", "Woman", and "Your Song".

According to Chuck Negron's autobiography, Three Dog Nightmare, the band originally suggested the title Dog Style for the album.  ABC/Dunhill Records rejected this as too risqué, but liked the idea of a "dog"-themed title for the album, and proposed the title Golden Bisquits instead.

Some editions of the album utilized alternative cover art, featuring a cropped version of the rejected cover photo for Three Dog Night's third studio album, It Ain't Easy.

Track listing

Personnel
Danny Hutton – vocals
Chuck Negron – vocals
Cory Wells – vocals
Mike Allsup – guitar
Joe Schermie – bass
Jimmy Greenspoon – keyboards
Floyd Sneed – drums

Production
Producers: Gabriel Mekler, Richard Podolor
Recording Engineers: Richard Podolor, Bill Cooper/American Recording Company
Photography: Ed Caraeff
Art Direction: Peter Whorf Graphics

Charts

Certifications

References

1971 greatest hits albums
Three Dog Night compilation albums
Albums produced by Richard Podolor
Albums produced by Gabriel Mekler
Dunhill Records compilation albums